Micajah Coffin (August 18, 1734 – May 25, 1827) was an American mariner, trader in the whaling industry and politician who served as a member of the Massachusetts House of Representatives.

Early life
Coffin was born to Benjamin and Jedida (née Hussey) Coffin on Nantucket, Province of Massachusetts, August 18, 1734. Of all his siblings, he was the one who became proficient in Latin and was able to have conversations in the Latin language with his father to the admiration and amazement of their friends. He worked as a carpenter in his early years.

Family life
On June 1, 1757, Micajah Coffin, at age 23, married Abigail Coleman, the daughter of Elihu Coleman, a distinguished Quaker preacher of his day  in the Nantucket Quaker Meeting House. They had four children: Isaiah, Gilbert, Jedida, and Zenas Coffin. Their youngest son, Zenas Coffin, became one of the most successful of Nantucket's eighteenth century whaling merchants. His first cousin was Sir Admiral Isaac Coffin.

Business career
Coffin was one of the leading mariners and traders in the whaling industry. Coffin and two of his sons, Gilbert Coffin and Zenas Coffin, operated a Nantucket based whaling firm during the late eighteenth and early nineteenth centuries called Micajah Coffin and Sons. Their firm conducted business dealing in whale oil, candles, potash, and supplies to Nantucket. Their firm not only conducted business in eastern United States ports, but also did so in the West Indies, France, Nova Scotia, Brazil, and England. Their firm had great success and laid the foundation for Zenas Coffin's future fortune which he later used to enrich the island.

Coffin's whaling firm's first ships were called "sloops" and went on short whaling cruises and trading cruises. The records show Micajah was either the owner or had business interests in the following "sloops": Fames, Hepzibah, Woolf, Speedwell, Friendship, and Brothers. In 1790, large-scale business began when Micajah bought the ship the Lydia. The Lydia could carry eight hundred barrels of oil (or freight equivalent). The first large-sized ships owned by the firm were: Hebe, Whale, Trial, Diana, Brothers, Phebe, and Cato.

Political career
In 1791, at age 57, Coffin was elected by a large vote as a member of the Massachusetts House of Representatives representing Nantucket. He served this office for 21 years from 1791 to 1812. For his first 15 years, he was the only representative for Nantucket County.

On May 29, 1795, Coffin offered an act to the House to change their current name of the "Town of Sherborn" in Nantucket County to the "Town of Nantucket" as there was another town with the same name in the Commonwealth of Massachusetts creating confusion for people. On June 8, 1795, this bill was endorsed and signed by Governor Samuel Adams which made it officially changed and known as Nantucket in Nantucket County.

Death
In Coffin's last years, he lost his mental acuteness. Coffin died on May 25, 1827. The Governor of Massachusetts at the time, Levi Lincoln, honored Micajah by visiting him on Nantucket the autumn before his death.

See also
 Coffin (whaling family)
 Coffin (surname)

External links
Internet Archive copy of Will Gardner's 1949 "The Coffin Saga" book

References

1734 births
Members of the Massachusetts House of Representatives
People from Nantucket, Massachusetts
1827 deaths
Micajah